The Devil Has Seven Faces (also known as The Devil with Seven Faces) is a 1971 Italian giallo film directed and co-written by Osvaldo Civirani. It starred George Hilton, Carroll Baker and Luciano Pigozzi. The film has also been released on video as  Bloody Mary (US) and Nights of Terror (UK).

Plot
Carroll Baker plays a dual role in this film, two identical twins named Julie and Mary. While in Holland, Julie begins receiving threats from some mysterious men who attempt to kidnap her, and one of them menaces her while wearing a gorilla mask. They are confusing her with her twin sister Mary in London, who stole a massive diamond from a Maharaja and even betrayed her husband Craig, who was in on the heist. A racecar driver named Tony (George Hilton) saves Julie from being kidnapped and hides her out in an apartment owned by an old blind woman, who later turns up murdered. Luciano Pigozzi plays an insurance investigator who is searching for the diamond.

Cast 
 Carroll Baker: Julie Harrison  
 Stephen Boyd: Dave Barton 
 George Hilton: Tony Shane 
 Lucretia Love: Margareth
 Luciano Pigozzi: Steve Hunter  
 Ivano Staccioli: Hank
 Daniele Vargas: James Marlowe 
 Franco Ressel: Inspector Rinker
 Carla Mancini
 Gianni Pulone
 Roberto Messina

References

External links

The Devil Has Seven Faces at Variety Distribution

1972 films
1970s crime thriller films
Giallo films
Films directed by Osvaldo Civirani
Films scored by Stelvio Cipriani
1970s Italian-language films
1970s Italian films